The 1947 Philadelphia Phillies season saw the Phillies finish in seventh place in the National League with a record of 62 wins and 92 losses. It was the first season for Phillies television broadcasts, which debuted on WPTZ.

Offseason
 Prior to 1947 season: Carl Sawatski was acquired from the Phillies by the Boston Braves.

On July 27, 1946, the City of Clearwater had announced that the Phillies had accepted Clearwater's invitation to train at Clearwater Athletic Field in 1947 on a one-year agreement. On March 7, 1947, the Phillies and city signed a 10-year deal for the Phillies to train in Clearwater. The Phillies lost their first spring training game in 1947 at Athletic Field to the Detroit Tigers by a score of 13–1. The Phillies' attendance that spring was 13,291 which was ninth out of the ten teams training in Florida.

Regular season 
April 22: During a game against the Brooklyn Dodgers, Phillies manager Ben Chapman hurled racial slurs at Jackie Robinson. Commissioner Happy Chandler warned the franchise to keep the manager under control or face disciplinary action. Of note, it was the first major league game in which Robinson committed an error.

June 2: The Phillies travel to Egypt, Pennsylvania to recruit Curt Simmons and play a team of all-star high school players from the Lehigh Valley. The game was played on the opening day of Egypt Memorial Park, June 2, 1947, in front of a crowd of 4,500. Simmons struck out eleven and the game ended in a 4–4 tie (a late-game error was the only thing that prevented the high school team from winning).

Season standings

Record vs. opponents

Notable transactions 
 May 3, 1947: Ron Northey was traded by the Phillies to the St. Louis Cardinals for Harry Walker and Freddy Schmidt.

Roster

Player stats

Batting

Starters by position 
Note: Pos = Position; G = Games played; AB = At bats; H = Hits; Avg. = Batting average; HR = Home runs; RBI = Runs batted in

Other batters 
Note: G = Games played; AB = At bats; H = Hits; Avg. = Batting average; HR = Home runs; RBI = Runs batted in

Pitching

Starting pitchers 
Note: G = Games pitched; IP = Innings pitched; W = Wins; L = Losses; ERA = Earned run average; SO = Strikeouts

Other pitchers 
Note: G = Games pitched; IP = Innings pitched; W = Wins; L = Losses; ERA = Earned run average; SO = Strikeouts

Relief pitchers 
Note: G = Games pitched; W = Wins; L = Losses; SV = Saves; ERA = Earned run average; SO = Strikeouts

Farm system 

LEAGUE CHAMPIONS: Utica, Wilmington, Schenectady, Vandergrift

Notes

References 
1947 Philadelphia Phillies season at Baseball Reference

Philadelphia Phillies seasons
Philadelphia Phillies season
Philadelphia